The Tannersville Cranberry Bog or Cranberry Swamp is a sphagnum bog on the Cranberry Creek in Tannersville, Pennsylvania.  It is the southernmost boreal bog east of the Mississippi River, containing many black spruce and tamarack trees at the southern limit of their ranges.  Technically, it can be classed as an acid fen, as it receives some groundwater flow.  The site was designated a National Natural Landmark in December 1974.  It was purchased by The Nature Conservancy and the Conservation and Research Foundation in  1957.  Like many bogs, its terrain presents an image of solidity, but a liquid mass of decaying peat lies beneath a six-inch (152 mm)  layer of sphagnum and a network of supporting tree roots.  However, this bog may be viewed from a floating walkway.

History

The bog began as a "kettle lake" formed approximately 10,000 years ago by a portion of the retreating Wisconsin Glacier (named according to geologic epoch, not location), which initially covered a depth up to the top of the current forest canopy. While young bogs may contain an "eye" of open water where sphagnum has not yet reached, no such feature remains in the Tannersville Cranberry Bog. However, a narrow strip of open water marks the course of the Cranberry Creek, where the water is less acidic.

Flora

Sphagnum moss
Conifers
black spruce
tamarack ("American larch", a deciduous conifer that lends a brilliant yellow hue in autumn)
Heath plants
highbush blueberry
leatherleaf
cranberry
sheep laurel
bog-laurel
swamp azalea
rhododendron
bog rosemary
swamp loosestrife
beggar's tick
Parasitic plants
dodder (on swamp loosestrife)
dwarf mistletoe (on black spruce)
Grasses
sedges (in more nutrient-rich areas)
cotton grass
yellow-eyed grass
Insectivorous plants
pitcher plant
sundew
Sun-loving plants (these are giving way to natural succession as heath plants predominate)
Labrador tea
golden-club (Orontium aquaticum)
hartford fern (Lygodium palmatum)
Orchids
grass pink
white-fringed orchid
rose pogonia
yellow lady's slipper
heart-leaf twayblade (not seen in recent years)
wild calla
gold thread
winterberry
sumac
poison sumac
poison ivy

Fauna
Carnivora
black bear
bobcat
coyote
gray fox
mink
river otter (Cranberry Creek)
Rodents
snowshoe hare
beaver
porcupine
Breeding birds
brown creeper
Nashville warbler
Canada warbler
wild turkey
barred owl
Others
bog turtle
pickerel (Cranberry Creek)
crayfish (Cranberry Creek)
bog copper butterfly (Lycaena epixanthe) (endangered)

Preservation
The call for preservation of this habitat began with William A. Niering, who as a child visited the bog as the nephew of its owner and was moved ultimately to become a widely recognized authority on bog ecology. The practical benefits of the bog were evident during the Flood of 1955, when bridges downstream of the bog were spared from the massive damage done in much of the Poconos. In 1956 The Nature Conservancy acquired the first  for protection.

Public visitation
Initially, public visitation to the land was not permitted. However, in the 1980s the Monroe County Conservation District negotiated access to the bog for purposes of public education. Planks are now replaced as needed with a recycled plastic product.

See also

Appalachian bogs
Tamarack Swamp

References

External links
The William A. Niering Memorial Page at Connecticut College Arboretum
The Stuart M. Stein Memorial Preserve at Tannersville Cranberry Bog (The Nature Conservancy)
The Monroe County Conservation District (Monroe County Environmental Education Center).  Note:  Much of the information presented here is taken from a MCEEC "bog walk" presentation delivered 9/6/6 and/or a flyer about the bog by John Serrao (1994) distributed by MCEEC.
Pictures taken from the last guided tour of the 2006 Season (10/22/2006).  Pictures courtesy of Anthony Skorochod

Appalachian bogs
Bogs of Pennsylvania
National Natural Landmarks in Pennsylvania
Nature Conservancy preserves
Protected areas of Monroe County, Pennsylvania
Nature reserves in Pennsylvania
Landforms of Monroe County, Pennsylvania